Charles J. Burstone (April 4, 1928 – February 11, 2015) was an American orthodontist who was notable for his contributions to biomechanics and force-systems in the field of orthodontics. He was well known for co-development of new orthodontic material such as beta titanium, nickel titanium, and long fiber-reinforced composite. He wrote more than 200 articles in scientific fields.

Career
Dr. Burstone was chairman of Indiana School of Orthodontics in 1961. In 1970, he created Orthodontic Department at University of Connecticut. He was the head of the department from 1970 to 1992. In 1994, he was appointed Professor Emeritus in the Orthodontic Department. He later retired and spent his time at Uconn Health Center.

Burstone published his first paper in 1959 in Journal of Dental Research. In 1961 Dr. Burstone was the first to introduce the photographic occlusogram.  He is also known to have developed the segmental Intrusion (orthodontics) arch technique in 1950s.

Burstone and Legan in their 1980 paper proposed a constructed horizontal line. This line is drawn through nasion at an angle of 7 degrees to the SN line. They developed this line because of reliability issues with the SN line when one can easily place the sella point up/down which can change the cephalometric measurements. This line tends to be parallel to the true horizontal line. Burstone also formulated B line which is a line constructed from soft tissue subnasale to soft tissue pogonion. He also developed COGS (Cephalometrics for Orthognathic Surgery) analysis for patients requiring orthognathic surgery.

Burstone created the Beta-Titanium orthodontic wire in 1980 and Chinese Niti wire in 1985. He also popularized the segmental-arch mechanics in 1962. He developed a T-Loop design for the purpose of space closure in orthodontics. He also wrote many papers related to the topic of center of resistance of anterior teeth during various orthodontic tooth movements.

Dr. Burstone worked with Dr. Ravindra Nanda at University of Connecticut Health Center. Dr. Flavio Uribe, current Program Director of the Uconn Orthodontic Department, received the Charles J. Burstone Endowed Professorship in Orthodontics in 2012. He died at the age of 86 in Seoul, South Korea.

Textbooks
 The Biomechanical Foundation of Clinical Orthodontics published in 2015
 Problem Solving in Orthodontics: Goal-Oriented Treatment Strategies published in 2000
 Retention and Stability in Orthodontics published in 1993
 The Biology of Tooth Movement published in 1988

Awards and positions
 1956 - AAO Research Essay Award 
 1965 - Appointed to dental study section of US Public Health Service 
 1969 - President of Great Lake Society of Orthodontists 
 1979 - Director of American Board of Orthodontists
 1983 - Strang Award by Connecticut Society of Orthodontists 
 1983 - Tokyo Medical-Dental Research Award
 1986 - President of American Board of Orthodontists 
 1987 - Sociade De Ortodoncia De Chile Award 
 1990 - Robert Strang Memorial Lecture Award 
 1991 - Jarabak Lecture Award, University of Michigan 
 1994 - Inducted into Royal College of Surgeons in Edinburgh, Scotland
 1999 - Ketcham Award by American Society of Orthodontists

See also 
 Intrusion (orthodontics)

References

External links
 UConn School of Dental Medicine bio

American dentists
Orthodontists
University of Connecticut faculty
1928 births
2015 deaths
Washington University School of Dental Medicine alumni
20th-century dentists